John Frederick may refer to:
John Frederick of Holstein-Gottorp (1579–1634), Lutheran administrator of the prince-bishoprics of Bremen, Lübeck and Verden
John Frederick I, Elector of Saxony (1503–1554), known as "The Magnanimous"
, "the middle one" (1529–1595)
John Frederick, Duke of Württemberg (1582–1628)
John Frederick (London MP) (1601–1685), British Member of Parliament for Dartmouth, 1660–1661, and City of London, 1663–1679, and Lord Mayor of London
Sir John Frederick, 4th Baronet (1708–1783), British Member of Parliament for New Shoreham, 1740–1741, and West Looe, 1743–1761
Sir John Frederick, 5th Baronet (1750–1825), British Member of Parliament for Newport, 1774–1780, Christchurch, 1781–1790, and Surrey, 1794–1807
John Frederick, a pseudonym of Frederick Schiller Faust (1892–1944), an American western author known as Max Brand
John Frederick, Margrave of Brandenburg-Ansbach (1654–1686)
John Frederick (English cricketer) (1846–1907), English cricketer
John Frederick (Australian cricketer), Australian cricketer
John T. Frederick (1893–1975), literary editor, scholar, critic, and novelist
John Frederick, Duke of Saxe-Weimar (1600–1628), Duke of Saxe-Weimar
John Frederick, Count Palatine of Sulzbach-Hilpoltstein (1587–1644)
John Frederick, Duke of Brunswick-Lüneburg (1625–1679)
John Frederick, Duke of Pomerania (1542–1600)
John Frederick, Prince of Schwarzburg-Rudolstadt (1721–1767)
John W. Frederick Jr. (1923–1972), American Marine POW during the Vietnam War

See also
Johannes Friedrich (disambiguation)
John Friedrich (disambiguation)